Sphingobacterium psychroaquaticum is a Gram-negative and psychrophilic bacterium from the genus of Sphingobacterium which has been isolated from lake water from the Lake Michigan in Wisconsin in the United States.

References

External links
Type strain of Sphingobacterium psychroaquaticum at BacDive -  the Bacterial Diversity Metadatabase	

Sphingobacteriia
Bacteria described in 2013
Psychrophiles